Lady Writing a Letter with her Maid is a painting by the Dutch artist Johannes Vermeer, completed in 1670–1671 and held in the National Gallery of Ireland, in Dublin. The work shows a middle-class woman attended by a housemaid who is presumably acting as messenger and go-between for the lady and her lover. The work is seen as a bridge between the quiet restraint and self-containment of Vermeer's work of the 1660s and his relatively cooler work of the 1670s. It may have been partly inspired by Ter Borch's painting Woman Sealing a Letter. The painting's canvas was almost certainly cut from the same bolt used for Woman with a Lute.

Lady Writing a Letter with her Maid is the first of the artist's experiments with centrifugal composition; where the focus is not only from the centre of the canvas. In addition, it is his third work in which the drama and dynamic is not centred on a single figure. The maid is shown standing in the mid-ground, behind her lady, with her hands crossed and waiting for the letter to be completed. The positions of their bodies indicate that the two women are disconnected. The folded arms of the maid seem outwardly as an attempt to display a sense of self-containment, however she is detached from her lady both emotionally and psychologically. The maid's gaze towards the half-visible window indicates an inner restlessness and boredom, as she waits impatiently for the messenger to carry her lady's letter away. Some art historians dispute the absoluteness of this view; according to Pascal Bonafoux, while complicity is not "indicated by a look or a smile" from either woman, the mere fact of her presence during such an intimate act as the composition of a love letter indicates at least a degree of intimacy between the two.

The painting visits many of Vermeer's usual painterly motifs; in particular his obsession with the inside/outside axis of interior spaces, and through his description of the tiled floor as well as the verticals of the dresses, window frame and back wall painting, his interest in geometry and abstract form. Vermeer had experimented with this painterly device earlier in his career, notably in his View of Delft, The Lacemaker and The Art of Painting.

Lady Writing was stolen on 27 April 1974, along with a Goya, two Gainsboroughs and three Rubens from the Russborough House home of Sir Alfred Beit by armed members of the IRA. Led by the British heiress Rose Dugdale, the thieves used screwdrivers to cut the paintings from their frames. However, the Vermeer and other works were recovered eight days later at a cottage in County Cork. The work was again taken in 1986 by a gang led by the Dublin gangster Martin Cahill. Along with a number of other art-works, Cahill held the painting for a ransom of IR£20 million. However, the money was not paid, and Cahill lacked contacts or knowledge to otherwise pass it on to international art thieves. According to a RTÉ report, Cahill's taste in art extended only to "cheery scenes like the cheap print in his living room of swans on a river, but he believed the stolen masterpieces would bring him a fortune." The painting was eventually recovered during an August 1993 exchange at Antwerp airport which turned out to be a sting operation organised by the Irish police. It had already been donated in absentia to the National Gallery in Dublin.

Notes

Sources
Bonafoux, Pascal. Vermeer. New York: Konecky & Konecky, 1992. 
Hart, Matthew. The Irish Game. London: Random House, 2004. 
Huerta, Robert. Vermeer and Plato: Painting the Ideal. Bucknell University Press, 2005.  
Pollock, Griselda. Differencing the canon. Routledge, 1999. 
Wheelock, Arthur K. Vermeer: The Complete Works. New York: Harry N. Abrams, 1997.

Further reading

External links
 Woman Writing a Letter, with her Maid at the website of the National Gallery of Ireland

Genre paintings by Johannes Vermeer
1670s paintings
Collection of the National Gallery of Ireland
Portraits of women
1670s in the Dutch Republic
Stolen works of art
Beit collection